Wortmann is a surname. Notable people with the surname include:

 Claire Waldoff born Clara Wortmann (1884–1957), German singer 
 Franz Xaver Wortmann (1921–1985), German aerodynamicist
 Hans Wortmann (born ca 1948), Dutch computer scientist
 Ivo Wortmann (born 1949), Brazilian former professional footballer
 Siegfried Wortmann, early twentieth century Austrian football (soccer) player 
 Sönke Wortmann (born 1954), German film director and producer

See also
 Corien Wortmann-Kool, (born 1959), Dutch politician